The Maués marmoset (Mico mauesi) is a marmoset endemic to Brazil. It is found only on the west bank of the Maués Açu River, in the Amazonas state.

References

Maués marmoset
Mammals of Brazil
Endemic fauna of Brazil
Maués marmoset
Maués marmoset
Taxa named by Russell Mittermeier